Joseph Stanley Douglas (4 April 1903 – 27 December 1971) was an English first-class cricketer, who played 23 matches for Yorkshire County Cricket Club between 1925 and 1934.

Born in Bradford, Yorkshire, England, Douglas was a left arm medium fast bowler, who took 49 wickets at 26.73 each, with a best of 6 for 59 against Oxford University.  His only five wicket haul in the County Championship was his 5 for 48 against Essex.  A left-handed tail ender, he scored 125 runs at 6.94, with a best score of 19 against Hampshire.

He also played for the Yorkshire Second XI (1925–1933) and Minor Counties North (1927).

Douglas died in December 1971 in Paignton, Devon.

References

External links
Cricinfo Profile
Cricket Archive Statistics

Yorkshire cricketers
Cricketers from Bradford
1903 births
1971 deaths
English cricketers